Alvin Batiste (November 7, 1932 – May 6, 2007) was an American avant-garde jazz clarinetist born, who was in New Orleans, Louisiana, United States.  He taught at his own jazz institute at Southern University in Baton Rouge, Louisiana.

His final album was a tribute produced by Branford Marsalis, and also featured Russell Malone and Herlin Riley.

Several well-known musicians studied under Batiste while at Southern University. They include Branford Marsalis, Randy Jackson, his brother Herman, Donald Harrison, Henry Butler, Charlie Singleton (Cameo), Ronald Myers and Woodie Douglas (Spirit). Mike Esneault, an Emmy Award-winning composer, pianist, and educator was also mentored by Batiste.

Batiste died in Baton Rouge, of a heart attack in his sleep, aged 74.

Discography

As leader
1984: Musique D'Afrique Nouvell Orleans (India Navigation)
1988: Bayou Magic (India Navigation)
1993: Late (Columbia Records)
1999: Songs, Words and Messages, Connections (SLM Records)
2007: Marsalis Music Honors Series: Alvin Batiste

As sideman
With Cannonball Adderley
The Black Messiah (1972)
With Billy Cobham
Magic (1977)
With Henry Butler
The Village (1987, Impulse!)
With Clarinet Summit
Clarinet Summit (1984)
With Marlon Jordan
Marlon's Mode (1997)
With Mark Whitfield
Patrice (1991)
With Wynton Marsalis
Crescent City Christmas Card (1990)

References

External links
Jazz News obituary

1932 births
2007 deaths
African-American woodwind musicians
American jazz clarinetists
Jazz musicians from New Orleans
India Navigation artists
Columbia Records artists
Avant-garde jazz clarinetists
20th-century American musicians
20th-century African-American musicians
21st-century African-American people